Rafael "Rafa" Vicente Ferreira Santos (born 14 February 1997) is a Portuguese professional footballer who plays as a midfielder for Real.

Club career
Santos is a youth product of Flamengo, Estoril, Real SC, Oeiras and Casa Pia. He spent most of his early career in the Campeonato de Portugal . He began his senior career with Moura, and followed that with stints at Olímpico Montijo, Amora Fátima, and  Oriental. On 19 June 2019, he signed a three-year contract with Belenenses SAD in the Primeira Liga.  Santos was called to the senior team after a COVID-19 outbreak hit the squad. One of only 9 starters in the squad for the match, he made his professional debut with B-SAD in a 7–0 Primeira Liga loss to Benfica on 24 July 2021 that ended up being called off.

References

External links

1997 births
Living people
Sportspeople from Cascais
Portuguese footballers
Association football midfielders
Belenenses SAD players
Clube Olímpico do Montijo players
C.D. Fátima players
Clube Oriental de Lisboa players
Real S.C. players
Primeira Liga players
Campeonato de Portugal (league) players